Peter Askjær-Friis (born 17 April 1947) is a Danish fencer. He competed in the individual and team épée events at the 1972 Summer Olympics.

References

1947 births
Living people
Danish male fencers
Olympic fencers of Denmark
Fencers at the 1972 Summer Olympics
Sportspeople from Copenhagen